Photoactivatable fluorescent proteins (PAFPs) is a type of fluorescent protein that exhibit fluorescence that can be modified by a light-induced chemical reaction.

History 

The first PAFP, Kaede (protein), was isolated from Trachyphyllia geoffroyi in a cDNA library screen designed to identify new fluorescent proteins. A fluorescent green protein derived from this screen was serendipitously discovered to have sensitivity to ultraviolet light--

We happened to leave one of the protein aliquots on the laboratory bench overnight. The next day, we found that the protein sample on the bench had turned red, whereas the others that were kept in a paper box remained green. Although the sky had been partly cloudy, the red sample had been exposed to sunlight through the south-facing windows.

Properties 

Many PAFPs have been engineered from existing fluorescent proteins or identified from large-scale screens in the wake of Kaede's discovery. Many of these undergo green-to-red photoconversion, but other colors are available. Some proteins take part in irreversible photoconversion reactions while other reactions can be reversed using light of a specific wavelength.

List of PAFPs

Applications 

Unlike other fluorescent proteins, PAFPs can be used as selective optical markers. An entirely labeled cell can be followed to assess cell division, migration, and morphology. Very small volumes containing PAFPs can be activated with a laser. In these cases, protein trafficking, diffusion, and turnover can be assessed.

References 

Bioluminescence
Protein methods